Zhao Keming (born ) is a general in the People's Liberation Army of China. He was a representative of the 14th National Congress of the Chinese Communist Party, 16th National Congress of the Chinese Communist Party, and 17th National Congress of the Chinese Communist Party. He was a member of the 16th Central Committee of the Chinese Communist Party. He was a delegate to the 9th National People's Congress and a member of the Standing Committee of the 11th National People's Congress..

Biography
Zhao was born in Wuhan, Hubei, in October 1942. He enlisted in the People's Liberation Army (PLA) in 1961, and joined the Chinese Communist Party (CCP) in the following year. He became a reporter of the People's Liberation Army Daily in 1980, and was despatched to the Guangzhou Military Region in August 1985. He served as deputy head and then head of the Propaganda Division of the People's Liberation Army General Political Department in May 1988. He was appointed political commissar of the 47th Group Army in February 1995. In January 1996, he became deputy political commissar  of the PLA National Defence University, rising to political commissar in July 2001. In March 2008, he took office as vice chairperson of the National People's Congress Financial and Economic Affairs Committee.

He was promoted to the rank of major general (shaojiang) in 1988, lieutenant general (zhongjiang) in 1998, and general (shangjiang) in 2004.

References

1942 births
Living people
People from Wuhan
People's Liberation Army generals from Hubei
People's Republic of China politicians from Hubei
Chinese Communist Party politicians from Hubei
Delegates to the 9th National People's Congress
Members of the Standing Committee of the 11th National People's Congress
Members of the 16th Central Committee of the Chinese Communist Party